San Vittorino Amiterno is a village in the Abruzzo, region of central Italy. It is a frazione of the comune of L'Aquila.

History
S. Vittorino is important because the ancient Roman city of Amiternum and Christian catacombs were discovered in the local church of San Michele Arcangelo.

References

Frazioni of L'Aquila